The Machin series  of postage stamps is the main definitive stamp series in the United Kingdom, used since 5 June 1967. It is the second series to figure the image of Elizabeth II, replacing the Wilding series.  The last issue was on 4 April 2022, four months before her death on 8 September.

Designed by Arnold Machin, they consist simply of the sculpted profile of the Queen and a denomination, and are almost always in a single colour.

After five decades of service, the series has encompassed almost all changes and innovations in British stamp printing. This has been encouraging an abundant specialised philatelic collectors' market and associated literature.

Arnold Machin's 1964 effigy of the Queen was replaced on British coins in 1984 by an older-looking effigy by Raphael Maklouf. However, the effigy on British Machin stamps has never been updated, and the last proposals to these ends were rejected by the Queen herself.

Genesis 

Since the accession of Elizabeth II in 1952, the definitive series figured a three-quarter photograph of the Queen by Dorothy Wilding. The same effigy had appeared on commemorative stamps too. However, the Wilding design did not please some artists. In a letter of April 1961, Michael Goaman and Faith Jacques argued that it represented the Queen, but not the monarchy. They complained it embarrassed the commemorative stamps' designers because the photograph took up one third of the stamp's area and it imposed a perspective on a two-dimensional design.

Some new designs were discussed but concerns over the technical aspects (a photograph or a painting inspired by a photograph) delayed a full competition for artists until 1965. Postmaster General Tony Benn and artist David Gentleman failed in their attempts to have the royal head replaced by the name of the country ("Great Britain" or "U.K."), but were permitted to explore temporary solutions to the commemorative head problems. This would of course have removed the uniqueness of the United Kingdom in being the only producer of postage stamps not to have its country name on its stamps in honour of its origination of the adhesive postage stamp in 1840. In 1966 Gentleman created a small single-coloured profile from a coin by Mary Gillick. The project waited until the miniaturisation of the new definitive effigy that the Stamp Advisory Committee (SAC) had advised the Postmaster General on 13 January 1965 be chosen, from profiles and engraved images based on a photograph.

The first essays were submitted by Andrew Restall and Arnold Machin with Harrison and Sons printers' assistance. They worked from photographs by Anthony Buckley, then from ones by Lord Snowdon, the Queen's brother-in-law. Machin had just finished work on the new coin's effigy based on the photographer's pictures. The competition began with more artists officially invited during Summer 1965, but at a meeting on 26 January 1966, the SAC's members decided to let only Gentleman and Machin continue work on the design.

Arnold Machin's method was to sculpt a bas-relief in clay and moulds, which he reworked and corrected depending on what the SAC required. The printing essays were then done by Harrisons & Sons from photographs of the sculpture, completed with the additions and adornments by designer Machin. Quickly, he decided to simplify the effigy with just the Queen wearing the Diamond Diadem and its bouquets of national flower emblems, like the Wilding series. Yet these flowers were also dropped: Machin's design would eventually have only the Queen's profile and the value of the stamp.

In March 1966, the Stamp Advisory Committee decided to make new photographs of the Queen available to Gentleman and Machin. They were taken by John Hedgecoe on the following 22 June. Elizabeth II selected the pictures to be given to the artists and Gentleman continued work on the "photographic alternative" to Machin's sculpture.

During the second period of 1966, Machin replaced the tiara with the George IV State Diadem on request of the SAC, the same diadem as was previously seen on the Penny Black. The Queen asked for a corsage at the bottom of her sculpted neck. The final sculpture is a rectangle of plaster, 16 inches long and 14 inches wide.

The last adjustments to the final plaster image and to the lighting during photography created four effigies. They were unveiled to philatelists on the pre-decimal stamps, the first ones issued 5 June 1967.

Concerning the original colours, Machin encouraged the use of a clearer effigy on a single-coloured background. The 4 pence ("4d") was given a very dark brown, inspired by the Penny Black and requested by the Queen herself. But the Post Office did not fully respect Machin's views and in the first years of the series would also issue bi-coloured stamps and clear-to-dark graduated backgrounds.

Evolutions 

From the philatelic point of view, the "Machins" are far more complex than the simple design might at first suggest, with well over five thousand varieties of colour, value, gum, phosphor banding, iridescent overprints, perforations, printing methods (Photogravure, Intaglio (Engraved), Typography, Electro-Mechanical Engraving (EME Gravure), Embossing) etc., known. Since the first stamps were issued pre-decimalisation, they exist in both old and new currencies. As postal rates changed, new denominations became necessary; the design has been adjusted periodically, for instance to use a gradated shade in the background; perforations have been changed; and so forth. In addition, for the regional or "Country" stamps of 1971, the regions' symbols were designed by Jeffery Matthews were added to the basic design.

Initially the stamps were produced by Harrison & Sons using photogravure, with the high-value designs being larger and engraved (intaglio) by Bradbury Wilkinson and Company. Starting around 1980, The House of Questa and Waddingtons Security Print also took up Machin printing in order to keep up with demand, producing their versions via lithography.

Apart from the many values of normal-sized stamps, there have been two different formats used for "high-value" definitives. In 1969 a larger and more square format was used to issue stamps of 2/6, 5/-, 10/- and £1 face value, and was used again in 1970 for the decimal currency values of 10p, 20p and 50p. (The £1 stamp had the lettering re-designed in 1972 and was re-issued. This version is usually seen as a 'decimal' edition as opposed to the 'pre-decimal' stamp.) In 1977 a taller portrait format was used for the large £1, £2, and £5 stamps, and also at various times between 1983 and 1987 for the odd values of £1.30, £1.33, £1.41, £1.50 and £1.60. These values were withdrawn after the introduction of the "Castles" high-value stamps of 1988.

The Castles stamps were the first in the reign of Elizabeth II to use a digit "1". All previous stamps of her reign had used a capital
"I" instead. All Machin stamps continue to use "I" apart from the large 1st class introduced in 2006.

In 1989, as a workaround to the problem of fast-changing rates, "non-value indicator" Machins used textual inscriptions "1st" and "2nd" to indicate class of service rather than a numeric value. The following year of 1990 brought forth the first commemorative adaptation of the Machin design, with the classic William Wyon profile of Queen Victoria, Queen Elizabeth II's Great-Great Grandmother, appearing behind and to the left of Elizabeth, marking 150 years of British stamps, namely the Penny Black 1d stamp of 1840. These are sometimes called "Double Head Machins".

1993 saw the introduction of both self-adhesive stamps and elliptical perforations on the lower vertical sides of the Machins, the latter as a security measure.

On the high value stamps, an iridescent ink by the brand name of "Iriodin" was used to give them a shiny, pearlescent appearance and ensure the difficulty of their reproduction by photocopying.

In February 2009, security features were increased on "Machin" self-adhesive stamps to avoid the reuse of uncancelled used stamps retrieved on mail. Both the effigy and the background were printed with continuous "ROYAL MAIL" iridescent printing. Two ellipsoidal shear panels were added to each stamp, and the water-soluble layer between the stamp and the adhesive was abandoned. These two later features were intended to render the stamps difficult to take off mail and to store for reuse (but in effect are easily overcome by the careful use of a sharp knife edge). Collectors are advised not to attempt to soak such stamps off, but to save them on pieces cut from the envelope.

The security features also included a minute change to the background printing of "ROYAL MAIL" where one letter is replaced to identify the source of the stamp.  For example, instead of "ROYAL MAIL" in one place in the upper right of the stamp is printed "FOYAL MAIL" to indicate that that stamp came from a booklet of four stamps.  This feature made it easier to identify the source of an individual, used stamp and track down production problems. The codes evolved further in the year 2010 when a year code was included as well. For instance MBIL/M11L means that the stamp came from a Business Sheet in 2011. The source codes are as follows: MBIL- From Business Sheets, MCIL- From Custom Retail Books with four Machins and two Special or Commemorative Stamps, MFIL- From Books of Four, MPIL- From Prestige Books, MRIL- From Coil Stamps in Rolls, MSIL- From Books of Six, MTIL- From Books of Twelve, and No source codes at all for Machin Stamps from Counter Sheets, though these do carry year codes.

In 2016, yet another security feature arose in that the Backing Paper for all of the Machin self-adhesive stamps had a Security background printing in Grey of "ROYAL MAIL" repeated (There are 3 types of this SBC of "Security Backing Paper")in yet another attempt a thwarting forgeries, which seems to be an ongoing problem.

Colours 
The most striking aspect of the Machins is the rainbow of colours. Since the designs are all identical (or nearly so), it was critical that each denomination be produced in an easily distinguished colour. Worse, the likelihood of rate changes meant that additional colours would be necessary, since old stamps were still valid and could appear on mail.

The initial palette of 14 colours was chosen after extensive testing. While most were solid colours, the 1/6d and 1/9d used different colours for effigy and denomination, while the 10d and 1/- had backgrounds that varied from darker on the left side to lighter on the right. The dark olive-brown shade of the 4d value, the most often-used stamp of the time, was personally selected by the Queen as being the available colour most reminiscent of the Penny Black. However, in practice this proved difficult to distinguish from the 5d's dark blue, automated machinery could not always see the phosphor bands on the stamps, and even football pool organizers complained that it was too hard to read the date and time of cancellations. In 1969, the 4d value was changed to vermilion, which in turn required a colour change for the 8d, which was reissued in "eggshell blue".

In preparation for decimalisation in 1971, the GPO prepared a new palette of colours, enlisting the Applied Psychology Unit of Cambridge University to test individuals' abilities to quickly identify colours. The results pruned a selection of 25 down to the 14 used for the decimal stamps.

During the 1970s a third effigy/ background colour format emerged in addition to the existing light head-dark background and the light head-graded background; the new variation consisted of the head the same colour as the background, with just the shaded detail picking out the image. (In more recent years the light head-dark background has become near universal.)

Over the years, rate changes required new denominations, and in order to make colours available, older stamps had to be withdrawn. For instance, the 11p rose of 1976 was withdrawn in 1980, and the colour reused in 1983 for a 23p stamp. A re-introduced denomination could not normally get its old colour back though; the light green 17p of 1980 was withdrawn in 1981, reissued in steel blue in 1983, withdrawn 1986, and reappeared yet again in 1990, this time in dark blue.

In 1983, Aubrey Walker of the Royal Mail's R&D department proposed a fixed assignment of colours to rates, on the theory that the classes of service changed much less frequently than rates. This still did not solve the problem of clerks detecting usage of old stamps with lower rates – they would have had to read the denomination rather than just glance at the colour – and so a system of "light" and "dark" colours was suggested, the two variants alternating at each rate change. Artist Jeffery Matthews was then hired to develop the actual colours, and in 1985 presented eight pairs totalling 16 colours. The colour pairing idea turned out to be unworkable, but the colours were adopted, and in 1988 Matthews developed another 15 as rates continued to be changed.

Machin head replacement 
On three occasions, postal sources have confirmed that a replacement for the Machin series was proposed by the Post Office, and its successor, the Royal Mail. However, the Queen has subsequently rejected the proposed designs.

In March 1981, after Raphael Maklouf's effigy was chosen to appear on new issue coinage, a proposal was made to replace the Machin's effigy by 1983; in time for the 30th anniversary of the Queens's coronation. The Post Office's Ron Dearing obtained agreement from the Queen, even if she expressed through a letter by her deputy private secretary that "Her Majesty is very content with the Machin effigy and thinks that a work of real quality is required if this is to be replaced."

Under the supervision of Post Office design adviser Barry Robinson, Jeffery Matthews prepared alternative essays from March 1982 pictures of the Queen by Lord Snowdon. Matthews used many different positions of the head and shoulders, from profile to full-face. Essays with the latter position were designed from the photographic representation and from a portrait drawn by his son Rory Matthews. In 1983, Robinson ordered new portraits by different artists : drawn by John Sargeant, painted by Timothy Whidborne and Brian Sanders, later engraved by Czesław Słania in 1984. Harrison and Sons printed these essays. However, they failed to please the Stamp Advisory Committee.

In June 1985, a new working group proposed a change to the original Machin stamp design. It comprised a bicoloured (grey effigy on a coloured background); Jeffery Matthews then worked on a different cut of the shoulders and neck, for a horizontal stamp. As Arnold Machin must be informed on any modifications of his original design, Barry Robinson and Jeffery Matthews visited him on 23 October 1985. Machin refused any changes by anyone except himself and didn't appreciate being approached after the proposed changes were finalised.

Following the abandonment of all of the proposed changes during the 1980s, some of Jeffery Matthews's designs were later used: the horizontal format served for the first self-adhesive stamps in 1993 and for the "higher rate" stamps of 2006.

Another attempt to alter the design was proposed on the occasion of the 150th anniversary of the Penny Black in 1990. The Queen's decision not to agree to any changes swiftly ended the move.

Ever changing Machins 
From the initial Harrison printings through to the present there has always been a wealth of study material for the Machin collector of any level.  The fact that printers and printing methods change so frequently means that collecting Machin stamps remains popular.  As is usual with a new printer, such as happened when Enschede, Waddington, Questa and Walsall were engaged, subtle changes occur giving rise to new varieties. The latest printer to be awarded considerable printing contracts for Machins is Cartor.  Cartor however has given collectors a new strand of Machin types from its Prestige Booklet panes and later mini-sheets to expand collections even more.

Machin series' Golden Anniversary, 2017 
On 5 June 2017, the Machin series celebrated its 50th year, or Golden Anniversary. To honour this series, Royal Mail went to great lengths to supply a plethora of new Machins for this much collected series. Two miniature souvenir sheets were issued with one of the stamps on the second sheet printed in the larger sized stamp format of 1970, and printed in 22kt gold foil and embossed. A five pane prestige book was issued for the 50th Anniversary of the Machin series with one of the five panes printed in 22kt gold foil and embossed as a block of four. A counter booklet of 1st class Machins showing a photo Arnold Machin at work sculpting the Machin Effigy. A group of 6 Machin Faststamps was issued and with some pre-decimal colours. Several first day of issue covers, including one with a specially made medallion coin cover with the Machin stamp effigy on one side, and the Machin coin effigy on the other.

Prestige Booklet Panes 
There has been a series of Prestige Booklet Panes produced since the first "Wedgwood" prestige booklet of 16 April 1980 starting with the "Stanley Gibbons" issue of 19 May 1982, consisting of a 3-square panel of 9 stamps or 8 stamps with a central non-value label.  Initially prestige booklets consisted of several panes of Machin stamps, plus several pages of narrative and pictures on the booklet's theme.   Over time panes of commemorative stamps related to the theme began to be included.  In recent years the stamps in prestige booklets contain primarily commemorative issues and only one pane of Machin stamps.
They are given the Royal Mail designation "DX" and are:

The wrong typeface 
All printers have in recent years been given a technical brief on printing Machin stamps from Royal Mail and Cartor would have had the same brief.  To reduce the risk of any mistakes the brief would set the standard for every element of the stamp including the typeface to be used for the value.  The standard typeface used currently throughout the Machin series is the Jeffery Matthews drawn typeface. This error 5p Garamond typeface value made an appearance on the 5p Deep Ash Pink value of the Classic Album Covers pane of 7 January 2010, as well as the 54p Rust value from the same book, though it has since been corrected on all other printings. What in effect happened was that the digital artwork for this value was omitted from the material sent to Cartor for Booklet Panes DP411 and DP416 as well. Rather than ask Royal Mail for it, the printer tried to match the Jeffery Matthews typeface but made the wrong choice (The printer chose a Garamond one), although the letter "P" was correct. The error wasn't picked up at the proof stage and was spotted only after the finished product samples were delivered. A "suitable process" was put into place to avoid a repetition of this kind of mistake. Differences in typeface fonts are not new and can easily be seen on the early non-value indicator gold issues.

Mini sheet printings 
High quality Machins are found in the eight values of the Colour Palette mini-sheet printed in photogravure by de la Rue and the eleven stamps of the 2010 Festival of Stamps mini-sheet printed in lithography by Cartor. Both sheets exhibit high quality printing and gave rise to all-new types and sub-types.

Overseas

Crown dependencies 
The first British stamps of the Machin series served as such in the Crown dependencies before their postal independence: Guernsey and Jersey until 1969 and the Isle of Man until 1973.

In Guernsey, the royal effigy on commemorative stamps was sometimes in the first years the Machin series effigy before the royal cypher was used (EIIR for Elizabeth 2 Regina).

Hong Kong 
In the British colony of Hong Kong, the last definitive series featuring Queen Elizabeth II was an adapted version of the British Machin stamp, though the Machin effigy was tilted forward slightly. The effigy is placed to the right side of the illustration to make place for the place name in Chinese characters. The background is bicoloured. These were printed by both Enschedé, and Leigh-Mardon in lithography.

The first values were issued in June 1992. Many commemorative miniature sheets used the Hong Kong Machin stamp to mark philatelic events and the last moments of the British rule on the colony, and most but not all of them were in the $10.00 Hong Kong dollar denomination.

To prepare for the sovereignty of the People's Republic of China in July 1997, the Machin series was replaced in January 1997 by a new definitive series showing the urban panorama of Hong Kong.

Somaliland 
In April 1996, the United Kingdom one penny Machin stamp was overprinted and used for a few days in Somaliland, a state that self-declared its independence from Somalia in 1991. Somaliland comprises the area formerly known as the British Somaliland Protectorate.

Due to an insufficient stock of paper, the British printer Harrison and Sons could not deliver in time a stamp issue ordered for Somaliland. Because of the lack of postage stamps there, it was decided to overprint "REPUBLIC / OF / SOMALILAND / 500 SHILLIN" on 4,300 Machin British one penny (1p) definitive stamps available at Harrison. The overprint was applied in Somaliland.

However, the stamps were quickly withdrawn and destroyed. There exist only about 30 or so genuinely postally used covers-and these were all posted by tourists who happened to be visiting Somaliland at the time.

Canada 
Canada Post issued a domestic rate stamp on 7 February 2022 using the Machin design, to mark the Platinum Jubilee of Elizabeth II. The stamp is available in booklets of 10 self-adhesive stamps. This is the first time the Machin design has appeared on a Canadian stamp.

References and sources

Sources of the articles 
Books

  With the genesis of the Machin effigy, the author, curator of the BPMA, described the context of philatelic creation in Great Britain during the second half of the 1960s.
  This book is a chronology of the Machin series main evolutions.

Articles

 Article about the pre-decimal Machin stamps (1966–1971).
 Topical article centered on the £1 Machin stamps, throughout the series, with a chronology of the contracted printers.
 David Alderfer and Larry Rosenblum, "Colors of Machins were carefully considered", Linn's Stamp News, 8 July 1996.
 Larry Rosenblum, "Machins rainbow barely keeps up with needs", Linn's Stamp News, 12 August 1996.

Notes

Specialised bibliography 
In English :
  The third and last printed edition was published in July 2003 (2 volumes, 1272 pages), with regular supplements written. A CD-ROM version was edited in April 2005, and a CD-ROM-only fourth edition was published in May, 2010. See Presentation of the 3rd edition on the Great Britain Machins by The "Machin Nut" website, 25 July 2003; retrieved 18 June 2007.
  Formerly Machin Specialised Catalogue, last updated in 2010 (2 volumes) with gummed stamps in the first volume, self-adhesives and booklets in the second one.
The Stanley Gibbons Specialised Catalogues, comprising:
Vol. 3 Queen Elizabeth II Pre-Decimal Issues (12th Edition), published in February 2011
Vol. 4 Queen Elizabeth Decimal Definitive Issues Part 1 (10th Edition), published in April 2008
Vol. 4 Queen Elizabeth Decimal Definitive Issues Part 2 (10th Edition), published in April 2010

In French :
  Fourth edition edited in June 2001.

External links 

 Great Britain Machins by The 'Machin Nut' (Robin Harris), specialised listings by face value.
 Machin Mania, specialised site with news pages.

Postage stamps of the United Kingdom
Stamps depicting Elizabeth II